The Lewis Henry Morgan Lecture is a distinguished lecture held annually by the Department of Anthropology at the University of Rochester. Begun in 1963, the lectures honor the career and seminal research of American anthropologist Lewis H. Morgan. Many of the lectures have been published, including the inaugural one by South African anthropologist Meyer Fortes.

References 

University of Rochester
Lectures